Philip Kutsu (born August 2, 1979, in Accra, Ghana) is a former Ghanaian professional football midfielder who played professionally in Ghana and the U.S. USL First Division.

Career 
Before moving to the United States, Kutsu played with Great Olympics and Hearts of Oak in Ghana.  In the spring of 2007, he attended an open try out with the expansion Carolina RailHawks of the USL First Division.  He won a spot on the roster, but a head injury led to his retirement.

References

1979 births
Living people
Ghanaian footballers
USL First Division players
North Carolina FC players
Association football midfielders